The Measure Museum of Tabriz is in Salmasi House.

The museum has a variety of weighing tools such as  goldsmith scales, large scales for field vegetables, the balance weights, oil modules, astronomical instruments like astrolabes, meteorology-related assessment tools, compasses and watches from the past centuries, and also, a 5 million year old tree belonging to the Pliocene, is held in the museum.

See also 
 Nobar bath
 Ferdowsi Street
 Shahnaz street

References 

Museums in Tabriz
Technology museums
Buildings of the Qajar period